Willy Paul Franz Lages (5 October 1901 – 2 April 1971) was the German chief of the Sicherheitsdienst in Amsterdam during the Second World War. From March 1941 he led the so-called Zentralstelle für jüdische Auswanderung (Central Bureau for the Jewish Emigration). As such, he was complicit in the mass deportations of 70,000 Dutch Jews to the concentration camps in Germany and occupied Poland. Lages also directly ordered multiple executions, including that of Hannie Schaft.

After the war, a court in the Netherlands found Lages guilty of war crimes and sentenced him to death in 1949. His sentence was confirmed in 1950. However, Lages was never executed since Queen Juliana, who had become increasingly reluctant to authorize death sentences, refused to sign his death warrant. This was opposed by the Dutch Cabinet, and there were large public protests against the possibility of amnesty for Lages. However, in 1952, Lages's sentence was commuted to life in prison.

In 1966, he was released from prison for humanitarian reasons on the grounds of his failing health. The decision taken by the minister of justice Ivo Samkalden provoked a public outcry. Lages received medical treatment in Germany after which he lived for another five years in Braunlage (Harz).

References

 
 David Barnouw and Gerrold van der Stroom, "Who betrayed Anne Frank?", Netherlands Institute for War Documentation (NIOD)

1901 births
1971 deaths
SS-Sturmbannführer
20th-century controversies
Holocaust perpetrators in the Netherlands
Gestapo personnel
German prisoners sentenced to death
Prisoners sentenced to death by the Netherlands
Nazis convicted of war crimes